The Bradford Bulls are a Canadian junior ice hockey team based in Bradford, Ontario, Canada.  They play in the Greater Metro Junior A Hockey League (GMHL).

History
The Bulls were announced on February 23, 2012, by the GMHL.  They are the namesake of the old Bradford Bulls Junior C team that which became the Bradford Rattlers.  The Ratters and Bulls play out of different arenas in Bradford, but gave the Rattlers a geographical rival.

The Bradford Bulls first regular season game was on September 16, 2012, in Bradford, Ontario. The game was on the road against the cross-town rivals the Bradford Rattlers. The game resulted in a 6–2 loss for the Bulls but had its first goal in franchise history scored by Clint Zumer, and assisted by Justin Tucker. On September 26, 2012, the Bulls would pick up their first franchise victory defeating the Lefroy Wave at home, 9–7.  Donald Oldreive made 41 saves to pick up the victory.

On March 26, 2013, the Bradford Bulls won the GMHL playoffs in a 4-games-to-1 series victory against their hometown rival and defending champion Bradford Rattlers.  The Bulls finished the regular season in first place in the South Division, fourth overall and three points out of second.  They faced the Knights of Meaford in the first round and swept them 3-games-to-none.  In the second round, they swept territorial rival Alliston Coyotes 3-games-to-none.  Instead of a division final, the league elected to do a divisional crossover and the Bulls had to face the second seed from the North, the Temiscaming Royals.  The Bulls took the series in a four-game sweep and were set to face the Rattlers in a "Sidewalk Series" as they knocked off the first seeded Seguin Huskies.  Although the Rattlers gave the Bulls their only loss of the playoffs, it was not enough as the Bulls took their first league title after only two years of existence.

Season-by-season standings

Playoffs
2013
Bradford Bulls defeated Toronto Canada Moose 3-games-to-1 in division quarter-finals
Orangeville Americans defeated Bradford Bulls 3-games-to-1 in division semi-finals
2014
Bradford Bulls defeated Knights of Meaford 3-games-to-none in division quarter-finals
Bradford Bulls defeated Alliston Coyotes 3-games-to-none in division semi-finals
Bradford Bulls defeated Temiscaming Titans 4-games-to-none in crossover series
Bradford Bulls defeated Bradford Rattlers 4-games-to-1 in finals
Russell Cup Champions
2015
Orangeville Americans defeated Bradford Bulls  6–5 (game) in Conference Elimination Round 1
2016
Oshawa Riverkings defeated Bradford Bulls 3-games-to-none in division quarter-finals
2017
Parry Sound Islanders defeated Bradford Bulls 3-games-to-none in division quarter-finals
2018
Bradford Bulls defeated North York Renegades 2-games-to-1 in division quarter-finals
St. George Ravens defeated Bradford Bulls 3-games-to-none in division semi-finals
2019
Ville-Marie Pirates defeated Bradford Bulls 2-games-to-1 in division quarter-finals
2020
Bradford Bulls defeated Bancroft Rockhounds 2-games-to-1 in division quarter-finals
Bradford Rattlers defeated Bradford Bulls 3-games-to-2 in division semi-finals

League award winners
Marshall Uretsky Award
An annual award "to the player who is adjudged the most valuable player (MVP) in the regular season"
 Tomi Taavitsainen 2014
Tyler Fines Award
An annual award "to the player selected as the most proficient in his first year of competition in the GMHL"
 Zan Hobbs 2015
 Sergei Bolshakov 2014
 Devon Gillham 2013
Louis Ricci Award
An annual award "to the forward who demonstrates throughout the season the greatest ability at the position"
 Tomi Taavitsainen 2014
Al Donnan Award
An annual award "to the goaltender adjudged to be the best at his position"
 Sergei Bolshakov 2014

Notable alumni
Sergei Bolshakov

References

External links
Bulls Webpage
GMHL Webpage

2012 establishments in Ontario
Ice hockey clubs established in 2012
Ice hockey teams in Ontario